The First Aid Convention in Europe (FACE) brings together around 1,000 participants from 30 countries each year in order to find out the most efficient team in a First Aid competition.  The teams come from the different National Red Cross and Red Crescent Societies in each country.  Each team consists of six people.

Competitions
 2016 Slovenian Red Cross (Website). Winner: Serbia, 2nd: Ireland, 3rd: Montenegro
 2015 Romanian Red Cross (Website). Winner: Slovenija, 2nd: Serbia, 3rd: Ireland
 2013 Austrian Red Cross (Website). Winner: Bulgaria, 2nd: Ireland, 3rd: Slovenija
 2012 Irish Red Cross. Winner: Italy, 2nd: Austria, 3rd: Armenia
 2011 Italian Red Cross (Website). Winner: Serbia, 2nd: Serbia, 3rd: Ireland
 2010 Serbian Red Cross (Website) Winner: Great Britain, 2nd: Slovenija, 3rd: Ireland
 2009 German Red Cross (Website). Winner: Serbia, 2nd: Ireland, 3rd: Italy
 2008 British Red Cross, Liverpool. (Website). Winner: Serbia, 2nd: Ireland, 3rd: Armenia
 2007 Irish Red Cross. Winner: Serbia, 2nd: Bulgaria, 3rd: Austria
 2006 Italian Red Cross. Winner: Serbia, 2nd: Ireland, 3rd: Armenia
 2005 Slovak Red Cross. Winner: Austria, 2nd: Ireland, 3rd: Austria
 2004 Austrian Red Cross. Winner: Armenia, 2nd: Belgium, 3rd: Germany
 2003 Czech Red Cross. Winner: Switzerland, 2nd: Great Britain, 3rd: Belgium
 2002 Belgian Red Cross. Winner: Ireland
 2000 Swiss Red Cross. Winner: Ireland
 1999 Austrian Red Cross. Winner: Ireland
 1998 Italian Red Cross. Winner: Italy
 1997 French Red Cross. Winner: Great Britain
 1996 Hungarian Red Cross. Winner: Ireland
 1995 Norwegian Red Cross. Winner: Ireland
 1994 British Red Cross. Winner: Great Britain
 1993 Austrian Red Cross. Winner: Great Britain
 1992 Swedish Red Cross. Winner: Austria
 1991 Swiss Red Cross. Winner: Great Britain
 1990 German Red Cross. Winner: Germany
 1989 Netherlands Red Cross. Winner: Austria
 1988 Finnish Red Cross. Winner: Finland
 1987 German Red Cross. Winner: Netherlands

External links
Serbian Red Cross top first aid team in Europe 2007
Information regarding FACE from the Irish Red Cross

First aid organizations
International Red Cross and Red Crescent Movement